Salémata is a small town with commune status in south-east Senegal. It is the chief settlement of  Salémata Department in Kédougou Region.  It lies close to the Niokolo-Koba National Park and the Dindefelo Falls, close to the border with Guinea Conakry.

The region is filled with a very mixed community being made up of several ethnic groups such as Bassaris, Peulhs, Bediks… 

Most of the population activities consists of agriculture, trade and animal breeding

Administration 
The village became a department in 2008 . Before that it was a rural community.

From 2008 to 2012, Kalidou Ba has been elected Deputy Mayor. He is a respected teacher and a notable in the area.

Then from 2012 on, Elhadj Mamadou Sall became President of the departmental council and deputy, reelected on both positions five years later. But was replaced in 2017 by Moussa Souaré due to the application of the law n° 96-11. 

In 2015, Kamissa Camara was elected Mayor.

In 2019 its population was recorded at 22,111.

References
2. Salemata petite commune du Sud Est du Sénégal. Published on 28 December 2020
Populated places in Kédougou Region
Communes of Senegal